Glycodeoxycholic acid is a bile acid derived from deoxycholic acid and glycine. Except where otherwise noted, data are given for materials in their standard state (at 25 °C [77 °F], 100 kPa).

References

Bile acids
Cholanes